Rhazya stricta (Persian: اشورک Eshvarak) is a native poisonous plant in Southern Iran, Afghanistan, Pakistan, India, Iraq, Oman, Yemen, and Saudi Arabia. The plant is an evergreen dwarf shrub of the family Apocynaceae.

References

External links
King Saud University, Autecology of Rhazya stricta

Rauvolfioideae
Plants described in 1835
Taxa named by Joseph Decaisne